White Cart Bridge is a Scherzer rolling lift bascule bridge situated on the A8 road in Renfrew, Scotland. The bridge crosses White Cart Water at the confluence with the Black Cart River. It is the only remaining lift bridge in the country and became category A listed on 13 December 1994. The bridge is still capable of opening, as the Doosan Babcock factory in Renfrew requires the capability to move large loads by river.

History
The White Cart and Black Cart Rivers have been an important crossing site for many years. Initially, people forded the rivers and latterly, a ferry was used to make the crossing. A bridge built in 1759 was a seven-arch bridge, crossing both rivers, but was washed away in 1809. Two separate bridges, still in use today, were built in 1812 as a replacement for the crossing. The new bridges could not accommodate large ships sailing into Paisley.

A new section of river bypassing the low bridge was completed by 1838, requiring a new bridge to cross the White Cart. Initially, a swing bridge was used to make the crossing. It was replaced by the lift bridge in 1923. The name "swing bridge" has remained locally, though the bridge lifts, rather than swings. The original channel bypassed by the cut under the new bridge gradually silted up, and the old bridge is now landlocked.

The bridge was designed by Scottish civil engineer Sir William Arrol. His company, William Arrol & Co, built some of the most famous bridges in the United Kingdom, including the Forth Bridge and Tower Bridge. They were responsible for the construction of the bridge at Renfrew.

In August 2004, a £1m restoration project in connection with Historic Scotland took place. This involved renewing all the mechanical components and resurfacing the road. The bridge was also painted red and cream and had new lights installed.

Gallery

See also
List of bascule bridges
List of bridges in the United Kingdom
List of Category A listed buildings in Renfrewshire
List of listed buildings in Renfrew, Renfrewshire

References

Transport in Renfrewshire
Road bridges in Scotland
Bascule bridges
Category A listed buildings in Renfrewshire
Renfrew
Bridges completed in 1923
1923 establishments in Scotland